Mellie Francon (born 24 January 1982 in La Chaux-de-Fonds) is a Swiss snowboarder.

Francon is Swiss Champion 2005 in snowboard cross. On 5 January 2006 she won the World Cup competition at Bad Gastein.

References 
 

Swiss female snowboarders
Olympic snowboarders of Switzerland
Snowboarders at the 2006 Winter Olympics
Snowboarders at the 2010 Winter Olympics
1982 births
Living people
People from La Chaux-de-Fonds
Sportspeople from the canton of Neuchâtel
21st-century Swiss women